Sergey Aleksandrovich Yung (born 10 August 1955) is a Russian former race walker who competed for the Soviet Union. He specialised in the 50 kilometres race walk.

Yung set his personal best of 3:47:16 hours for the event in Moscow in 1982. He competed at the 1982 European Athletics Championships and placed tenth overall.

The 1983 season saw his greatest successes. He began with the silver medal at the 1983 IAAF World Race Walking Cup, finishing behind Mexico's Raúl González. He followed this with a win at the Spartakiad, becoming the Soviet champion. The first World Championships in Athletics was held in Helsinki later that year and Yung was the bronze medallist there, beaten only by Ronald Weigel and José Marín.

References

External links

Living people
1955 births
Russian male racewalkers
Soviet male racewalkers
World Athletics Championships athletes for the Soviet Union